The Port of Milwaukee, branded as Port Milwaukee, is a port in the city of Milwaukee on Lake Michigan. It primarily serves Southeastern Wisconsin, Southeastern Minnesota, and Northern Illinois. The port owns  of rail that connect to two Class I railroads outside the port. The port has  dedicated to dry bulk storage, which includes four domes capable of handling 50,000 tons of storage.

Port of Milwaukee handled 2.4 million metric tons of cargo through its municipal port in 2014. Commodities handled include salt, steel, limestone, general cargoes, over-dimensional cargoes, grain, fertilizers, biodiesel, and ethanol.

In 2012, a wind turbine, funded by a federal grant, was installed. It is used to power the port's administration building, with the turbine providing electricity for the building itself as well as revenue from surplus generation.

The port is home to the Lake Express ferry, which offers service from Milwaukee to Muskegon, Michigan.

The Sector Lake Michigan of the United States Coast Guard is based at the port.

The port is landlord to the lakefront recreational facilities including Milwaukee World Festival, Inc. (Summerfest), Discovery World at Pier Wisconsin, and the south lawn of the Milwaukee Art Museum.

Recent Changes

In January 2020, the port suffered millions of dollars in damage from heavy winds and waves.

In October 2021, the port received a $35 million investment, the largest since the 1950s. The investment was designed to help with the shipping of "dry distillers grain with solubles" (DDGS), a coproduct of produced by the conversion of corn to ethanol, a significant bovine feed component.

References

External links

Milwaukee County, Wisconsin
Foreign trade zones of the United States
Transportation in Wisconsin